Antonello Palombi (born 7 July 1968) is an Italian operatic tenor.

Palombi joined the Carabinieri, Italy's paramilitary police force, when he was 20. (His father was also in the Carabinieri). While stationed in Perugia and Florence, he also sang in the cathedral choir of Todi. At the suggestion of the choirmaster there, he decided to study singing seriously. After private lessons, he made his debut in 1990, as Pinkerton in Madama Butterfly in the small German city of Fürth. He went on to sing in various European and Italian opera houses. He made his American debut in 2004 as Dick Johnson in Puccini's La fanciulla del West at the Seattle Opera. He subsequently appeared in the US as Canio in Pagliacci at Dallas Opera and Palm Beach Opera, as Radames in Aida at Michigan Opera Theatre, and as Cavaradossi in Tosca at Cincinnati Opera.

On 10 December 2006, he was thrust into the media spotlight in Franco Zeffirelli's new production of Aida at La Scala, which opened the theatre's 2006–2007 season. During the second night of the run, Palombi took over the role of Radames when Roberto Alagna walked off the stage after booing from the loggione (opera fans who sit in the less-expensive seats at the very back of the Scala). Palombi, his understudy, entered on stage wearing jeans and a black shirt to finish the act, and returned in costume after the interval to sing the remainder of the opera.

References

External links
Official Site at liricopera.com (includes audio samples)
Antonello Palombi, Tenor, Pinnacle Arts Management
"Roberto Alagna Booed at La Scala" Telegiornale 3 (RAI), December 2006, at youtube.com

1968 births
Living people
Italian operatic tenors
People from Spoleto
Carabinieri
20th-century Italian  male opera singers
21st-century Italian male  opera singers